Stevan Treleaven Eldred-Grigg is a New Zealand author of ten novels, eleven history books and various essays and short stories.

Writings

In 1978 Eldred-Grigg completed a history PhD thesis at Australian National University called  'The pastoral families of the Hunter Valley, 1880-1914' 

In 1987 he published his first novel, Oracles and Miracles, the story of two sisters growing up in Christchurch before and during World War II.

Eldred-Grigg was the first living New Zealand writer of literary fiction to have had a novel translated into Chinese when Oracles and Miracles, was published in Shanghai in 2002 under the title ‘剩’贤奇迹.

Bibliography
Memoirs:
 My History, I Think (Penguin, 1994)
 Green Grey Rain (Piwaiwaka Press, 2021)

Novels:
 Oracles and Miracles (Penguin, 1987)
 The Siren Celia (Penguin, 1989)
 The Shining City (Penguin, 1991)
 Gardens of Fire (Penguin, 1993)
 Mum (Penguin, 1995)
 Blue Blood (Penguin, 1997)
 Sheng Xian Qu Ji (Yi-wen Shanghai, 2002)
 Shanghai Boy (Random House, 2006)
 Bangs (Penguin, 2013)
 Pru Goes Troppo (Piwaiwaka Press, 2020)

History:
 A Southern Gentry (AH & AW Reed, 1980, 1986)
 A New History of Canterbury (John McIindoe, 1982)
 Pleasures of the Flesh, (Reed Methuen, 1984)
 New Zealand Working People (Dunmore Press, 1990)
 The Rich (Penguin, 1996)
 Niu Xilan de Wenxue Lucheng (Unitas Taipei, 2004)
 Diggers, Hatters and Whores (Random House, 2008)
 The Great Wrong War: New Zealand Society in the First World War (Random House, 2010)
 People, People, People (David Bateman, 2011)
 White Ghosts, Yellow Peril: China and New Zealand 1790-1950 (Otago University Press, 2014)
 Phoney Wars: New Zealand Society in the Second World War (Otago University Press, 2017)

References

External links
 
 
 Biography on the New Zealand Book Council site
 Personal website

1952 births
New Zealand male short story writers
New Zealand male novelists
Living people
20th-century New Zealand historians
University of Canterbury alumni
Australian National University alumni
Writers from Christchurch
20th-century New Zealand novelists
21st-century New Zealand novelists
International Writing Program alumni
20th-century New Zealand short story writers
21st-century New Zealand short story writers
21st-century New Zealand historians
20th-century New Zealand male writers
21st-century New Zealand male writers